Nawal Slaoui (born 16 February 1966) is a Moroccan alpine skier. She competed in three events at the 1992 Winter Olympics.

References

1966 births
Living people
Moroccan female alpine skiers
Olympic alpine skiers of Morocco
Alpine skiers at the 1992 Winter Olympics
Place of birth missing (living people)